"Derezzed" is an instrumental song written, produced and performed by Daft Punk for the soundtrack of the motion picture Tron: Legacy, available on the album of the same name. As a pre-order bonus for the album on the iTunes Store, "Derezzed" was released by Walt Disney Records as a single on December 8, 2010. It was remixed by The Glitch Mob and Avicii for the remix albums Tron: Legacy Reconfigured and Dconstructed. "Derezzed" was also included on a 4-track vinyl EP titled Translucence, released by Walt Disney Records.

Music video
The music video for "Derezzed" was directed by Warren Fu. It begins as Daft Punk enters Flynn Arcade and approaches the ENCOM game called Derezzed. They insert quarters and start playing, with Guy-Manuel de Homem-Christo playing as Prog 1 and Thomas Bangalter as Prog 2. The music starts just as Bangalter presses his "start" button. The Derezzed game plays out as a joust with light cycles in the grid. As an indiscernible program watches the joust in the distance, Prog 2 wins the match. In the arcade, de Homem-Christo is disappointed. Back in the grid, Prog 2 is revealed to be Quorra (Olivia Wilde).

Track listings

Chart positions

Weekly charts

Year-end charts

Certifications

See also
 List of number-one dance singles of 2014 (U.S.)

References

External links

2010 singles
2014 singles
Daft Punk songs
Disney songs
Tron music
Walt Disney Records singles
Songs written by Guy-Manuel de Homem-Christo
Songs written by Thomas Bangalter
2010 songs
Music videos directed by Warren Fu